Miss Norway (formerly known as "Frøken Norge") is a national beauty pageant in Norway The pageant was founded in 1950, where the winners were sent to Miss Universe.

History
Miss Norway was held for first time in 1950 by Dagbladet Magazine. There were no official Frøken Norge or Miss Norway titleholders from 1975 to 1982 during which Norwegian model agencies sent girls to international pageants. Since 1983 the pageant was run by Frøken Norge Corporation. In 2000 - 2010, the pageant was sponsored by TV2 Network.

Traditionally, the winner will get a chance to compete at Miss World pageant. Meanwhile, the runners-up will compete at Miss Universe, Miss International and Miss Europe. Sometimes the winner will be able to compete at the other pageants. 
In May 2012, a new concept called "Miss Universe Norway" was established by the company "Motivaction AS" after the application for the license for Miss Universe in Norway was approved.

From 1985 to 2011, "Frøken Norge" (registered trademark) with supervisor Geir Hamnes, sent candidates to Miss World and Miss Universe. From 1983 to 2008, "Miss Norway" (registered trademark) run by Geir Killingland, sent representatives to other beauty pageants such as Miss International, Miss Earth and others. After mr. Killingland died in 2009, his friends and family recovered "Miss Norway" in 2010, as a tribute to Killingland, and sent representatives to Miss Earth and Miss International that year.

In 2017 Miss Norway selects representatives to compete in Miss Universe, Miss World, Miss International.

Titleholders
Below are list of Frøken Norge, Miss Norway and Norske Miss Universe winners who represent their country at the Miss Universe, Miss World and Miss International pageants. On occasion, when the winner does not qualify (due to age), a runner-up is sent.

Titleholders under Miss Norway org.

Miss Universe Norway

The winner of Miss Universe Norway represents her country at the Miss Universe. On occasion, when the winner does not qualify (due to age), a runner-up is sent. Norway sent its first Miss Universe representative to the first Miss Universe pageant in 1952. Norway has won Miss Universe once, Mona Grudt in 1990.

Miss World Norway

 Miss Norway represents her country at the Miss World. In 2012 the Miss Norway recovered its foundation into the Miss Universe Norway Organization by Armand By. Started in 2017 the Miss World franchise returned to Miss Norway since 2013 the Norwegian representatives at Miss World were all designated.

Miss International Norway

The Miss Norway winners came to Miss International. Began in 2014 a Runner-up of Miss Norway represents her country at Miss International. In Miss International, Norway has two Miss International winners such as Catherine Alexandra Gude in 1988 and Anne Lena Hansen in 1995.

Miss Supranational Norway

Miss Earth Norway

The Miss Norway franchised the Miss Earth competition until 2011. Since 2012 the name of Miss Earth Norway awarded to the winner of Miss Earth Norway (Casting). In 2018 the Miss Norway was almost successfully sending one of runners-up of Miss Norway to Miss Earth.

Disqualified contestants 
According to the Miss Norway regulations, candidates must not have been pictured naked in a commercial production or publication.

In 2004, contestant Aylar Lie was disqualified from the contest when it was found she had appeared in many pornographic movies.

See also 
Norway at major beauty pageants

References

External links

Miss Norway

 
Recurring events established in 1950
1950 establishments in Norway
Norwegian awards
Norwegian entertainment-related lists
Lists of events in Norway